Peter McNamara and Paul McNamee were the defending champions, but decided to rest after competing in the Davis Cup the previous week.

Mark Edmondson and Brian Teacherwon the title by defeating Andreas Maurer and Wolfgang Popp 6–3, 6–1 in the final.

Seeds

Draw

Draw

References

External links
 Official results archive (ATP)
 Official results archive (ITF)

Stuttgart Doubles
Singles 1982